Víctor Miguel González Chang (born 30 May 1994) is a Chilean footballer who plays as a defender for Chilean club Deportes Temuco.

Career
After playing for Colo-Colo B at the Segunda División, the third level of Chilean football, until 2013–14 season, he had no chances to play in the professional squad on 2014–15 season. So, he joined San Antonio Unido on second half year 2016.

Playing for Deportes Valdivia at the Primera B he achieved consistency, what carried him to join Coquimbo Unido for playing at the both Primera División and Copa Sudamericana by first time on 2020.

He joined Deportes Temuco for the 2023 season.

Career statistics

Club

Notes

References

External links

1994 births
Living people
People from El Loa Province
Chilean people of Chinese descent
Chilean footballers
Association football defenders
Colo-Colo footballers
Colo-Colo B footballers
San Antonio Unido footballers
Deportes Valdivia footballers
Coquimbo Unido footballers
Unión La Calera footballers
Deportes Temuco footballers
Segunda División Profesional de Chile players
Primera B de Chile players
Chilean Primera División players